António Alfredo Barjona de Freitas (11 April 1860 – 8 May 1923) was a Portuguese colonial administrator, military officer and politician.

He was governor general of Cape Verde from 12 August 1903 until 29 December 1904. He was Minister of Public Works from 14 May to 22 December 1909 in the government of Venceslau de Lima.

Works
Considerações sobre a província de Cabo Verde: comunicações à Sociedade de Geographia de Lisboa. Lisbon, Livraria Ferin, 1905.

See also
List of colonial governors of Cape Verde

References

1860 births
1923 deaths
People from Coimbra
Colonial heads of Cape Verde
Portuguese colonial governors and administrators
Portuguese brigadier generals
19th-century Portuguese military personnel